Xiqin is a town under the administration of Yanping District, Nanping in Fujian, China. , it has one residential community and 20 villages under its administration.

Transportation 
Yanping West railway station is located in Xiqin.

References 

Township-level divisions of Fujian
Nanping